The 2011 Portimão Superbike World Championship round was the thirteenth and final round of the 2011 Superbike World Championship. It took place on the weekend of October 14–16, 2011 at Autódromo Internacional do Algarve, Portimão, Portugal.

Results

Superbike race 1 classification

Superbike race 2 classification

Supersport race classification

Portimao Round
Portimao Superbike